Andrés Confesor Santana Belonis (born February 5, 1968) was a Major League Baseball player who played for the San Francisco Giants in . He was used as a pinch hitter, and as a shortstop.

External links

1968 births
Living people
Dominican Republic expatriate baseball players in the United States

Major League Baseball players from the Dominican Republic
Major League Baseball shortstops
San Francisco Giants players
Clinton Giants players
Dominican Republic expatriate baseball players in Canada
Dominican Republic expatriate baseball players in Taiwan
Edmonton Trappers players
Phoenix Firebirds players
Pocatello Giants players
San Jose Giants players
Shreveport Captains players
Uni-President Lions players